Balwinder Safri (15 December 1958 – 26 July 2022) was a United Kingdom–based Punjabi folk singer active since 1980s and founder of Safri Boyz Band (1990). He was best known as Bhangra Star for his contribution to Punjabi music industry. A few of his hit songs include "O Chan Mere Makhna", "Pao Bhangra", "Gal Sun Kuriye", "Nachdi nu", 'Rab Dian Rakhan" (1996), "Ishq Nachavye Gali Gali" (1996) and "Laali" (1998). Safri underwent triple bypass surgery and suffered brain damage while at New Cross Hospital. He died on 26 July 2022 in Wolverhampton, UK, shortly after being discharged from the hospital.

References

Further reading

External links
 
 

1958 births
2022 deaths
Punjabi singers
Indian singers